Lipopterocis is a genus of tree-fungus beetles in the family Ciidae.

Species
 Lipopterocis simplex Miyatake, 1954

References

Ciidae genera